An election to Letterkenny Town Council took place on 10 June 1999 as part of that year's Irish local elections. 9 councillors were elected by PR-STV voting for a five-year term of office.

Results by party

Results
 Sitting in italics

Elected
 Seán Maloney, Labour
 Jim Lynch, Independent
 Ciaran Brogan, Independent
 Terry McEniff, Fianna Fáil
 Dessie Larkin, Independent Fianna Fáil
 Victor Fisher, Fianna Fáil
 P. J. Blake, Independent
 Jimmy Harte, Fine Gael
 Jean Crossan, Fianna Fáil

Excluded
 Patch Crossan, Fianna Fáil
 Tadhg Culbert, Fianna Fáil
 Joseph Gallagher, Independent
 Martin Brogan, Sinn Féin
 Jimmy Kavanagh, Independent
 Tommy Ronaghan, Independent
 Paddy Gildea, Fine Gael
 Karen McGlinchey, Labour
 Donal Coyle, Independent
 Doreen Sheridan Kennedy, Fine Gael
 John Devine, Independent
 Frank Brogan, Independent
 John MacElhinney

External links
 Letterkenny Town Council election, 1999 at electionsireland.org (archive link)

1999 Irish local elections
Politics of Letterkenny